John Morgan (June 12, 1846 – February 10, 1926) was a member of the Wisconsin State Assembly.

Biography
John J. Morgan was born on June 12, 1846 in Wethersfield, New York. He graduated from what is now the University at Buffalo School of Medicine and Biomedical Sciences in 1873 and from Albany Law School in 1884. On October 27, 1887, Morgan married Jane Humphrey, with whom he had two children.

Career
Morgan was elected to the Assembly in 1914. Previously, he had been elected County Clerk of Pepin County, Wisconsin in 1880 and held the position for eight years. He was also District Attorney of Pepin County from 1886 to 1888 and Mayor of Durand, Wisconsin from 1902 to 1905. Morgan was a Republican.

Death and burial
Morgan died in Durand on February 10, 1926.  He was buried at Forest Hill Cemetery in Durand.

References 

People from Wyoming County, New York
People from Durand, Wisconsin
Republican Party members of the Wisconsin State Assembly
Mayors of places in Wisconsin
District attorneys in Wisconsin
County clerks in Wisconsin
Physicians from Wisconsin
University at Buffalo alumni
Albany Law School alumni
1846 births
1926 deaths